Sand Slough is a community in St. Francis County, Arkansas, United States, notable for being the birthplace of boxing heavyweight champion Sonny Liston.

References 

Unincorporated communities in Arkansas